Košarkaški klub Mornar (Cyrillic: Кошаркашки клуб Морнар), commonly referred to as Mornar Barsko zlato for sponsorship reasons, is a men's professional basketball club based in Bar, Montenegro. The club competes in the Montenegrin Basketball League and the ABA League.

The team also plays in international competitions. Mornar made its European debut in the Basketball Champions League during the 2016–17 season. Mornar won its first domestic title the following year in the 2017–18 Montenegrin League.

History
In the 2015–16 season, Mornar managed to reach the Balkan League and Montenegrin League Finals but lost both. In the 2016–17 season, Mornar returned to European competition when it qualified for the Basketball Champions League regular season. The club also made its debut in the Adriatic League.

In its second ABA League season, the club qualified for the semifinals. In the playoff semifinals, Mornar was eliminated by Crvena zvezda, 2–1.

On 30 May 2018, Mornar achieved its first league ever by defeating Budućnost in the 2017–18 Montenegrin League finals.

In December 2020, the club became a shareholder of the Adriatic Basketball Association, following a transfer of shares from MZT Skopje Aerodrom.

On 11 September 2021, the club announced a change of their name to Mornar Barsko zlato for sponsorship reasons.

Home arena 

Mornar plays their home games at the Topolica Sport Hall, which is located in Bar and owned by the PC Sports and Recreation Centre. The arena was opened on 23 November 2009. It has a seating capacity of 3,500.

Trophies and awards

Domestic competitions
Montenegrin League
Winners (1): 2017–18
Runner-up (6): 2010–11, 2015–16, 2016–17, 2018–19, 2020–21, 2021–22
Montenegrin Cup
Runner-up (7): 2010, 2016, 2017, 2018, 2020, 2021, 2022

Regional competitions
Balkan League
Runner-up (1): 2015–16

Season by season

Source: Eurobasket.com

Players

Current roster

Depth chart

Coaches

  Mihailo Pavićević (1989–1996)
  Đorđije Pavićević (1997–1998)
  Đorđije Pavićević (2003–2011)
  Mihailo Pavićević (2011–2013)
  Đorđije Pavićević (2013–2017)
  Mihailo Pavićević (2017–present)

Management 
Current officeholders are:
 President: Đorđije Pavićević
 Assembly Chairman: Dušan Raičević
 General manager: Lazar Pavićević
 Sporting director: Drago Spičanović

Notable players

  Aleksandar Lazić
  Nemanja Gordić
  Jacob Pullen
  Đuro Ostojić
  Nikola Ivanović
  Nemanja Vranješ
  Vladimir Mihailović
  Radoje Vujošević
  Milija Miković
  Derek Needham
  Vukota Pavić
  Nemanja Radović
  Marko Mijović
  Ivan Paunić
  Uroš Luković
  Nemanja Krstić
  Đorđe Gagić
  Nikola Rebić
  Strahinja Mićović
  Brandis Raley-Ross
  Morris Finley
  Antabia Waller
  Octavius Ellis
  Cameron Tatum
  Lamont Jones
  Isaiah Whitehead
  Kenny Gabriel

References

External links
 
 KK Mornar at balkanleague.net
 Eurobasket.com KK Mornar Bar Page

Mornar
Basketball teams established in 1974
Mornar
Sport in Bar, Montenegro
1974 establishments in Montenegro